Folklorama is an event that runs for two weeks each August in Winnipeg, Manitoba, Canada. Visitors to the festival are invited to sample cuisine and celebrate the cultural and ethnic heritage of people from dozens of cultures who have made Winnipeg their home. Folklorama is the world's largest and longest-running multicultural festival.

Each culture has an assigned venue, known as a pavilion. Typically there are over 40 pavilions presented throughout the city, with half operating in week one and half in week two of the festival.  Each pavilion presents a show featuring the song and dance of their culture, along with trademark ethnic cuisine and a cultural display. Some pavilions also incorporate additional services such as henna tattoo application, steel pan drum workshops, and some have late night parties. Most pavilions provide imported cultural beverage.

Folklorama provides exposure to cultural groups and brings in thousands of tourists each year, adding to the city's economy. It is the largest and longest-running festival of its kind in the world (determined by the International Council of Organizations for Folklore Festivals and Folk Art, also known as CIOFF). The Folk Arts Council of Winnipeg is the organizing body of Folklorama.

History

Folklorama was first held in August 1970, as a Centennial Folk Festival sponsored jointly by the City of Winnipeg and the Folk Arts Council of Manitoba. It was originally intended to be a one-time occurrence in celebration of Manitoba's centennial. It was deemed such a success that it became an annual event. The first festival was only a week long, featuring 21 different cultures. The Indian, Greek, Portuguese, Ukraine, and the Africa/Caribbean Pavilions were one of the festival's original six pavilions; it drew approximately 50,000 people across 75,000 separate pavilion visits. The festival adopted its current two-week format in 1988, with half of the pavilions open in each week.

The Folklorama logo was designed by Andy Stout who won the provincial logo contest in 1980. The 4 figures in the logo represent people from the four corners of the globe, who are intertwined, with arms raised in celebration. The festival's mascot, the Folklorama Llama, was created in 1986.

Until 1989, pavilions would have a mayor and a queen. The queen would be in the running for the Miss Folklorama pageant at the closing ceremony of the Festival. The Miss Folklorama pageant was not a beauty pageant but a "contest of ethnic preservation and presentation", as the pavilion queens were scored based on 40% knowledge of culture and country, 40% on participation and 20% on poise and personality. Since 1990, pavilions now feature two adult ambassadors and two youth ambassadors, neither of whom must be of a specific gender.

The 50th edition of the Folklorama festival was in 2019. There were 22 pavilions in the first week including: African, Argentina "Tango", Budapest-Hungaria, Caribbean, Celtic Ireland, Chile, Egyptian, El Salvador, Ethiopian, First Nations, German, Greek, India, Israel "Shalom Square", Korean, España-Spain, Portugal, Scandinavian, Serbian/Beograd, Slovenija, Ukraine "Spirt of the Ukraine", and the United Kingdom. There were 23 pavilions in the second week, including: Africa/Caribbean, Brazilian, Canadien-Français, Chilean, Chinese, Croatian "Zagreb", Hungary-Pannonia, Irish, Italian, Japanese, Métis, Mexican, Scotland, Philippines "Pearl of the Orient", Portuguese "Casa do Minho", Polish, Punjab, Romanian, Russian, Serbian "Kolo", South Sudanese, Tamil, and Ukraine-Kyiv.

Program areas
Throughout the year, Folklorama is sustained by its Ethno-Cultural Arts Division and programs: Folklorama at Home, Folklorama at School, Folklorama at Work, and Folklorama at Play.

Statistics
 On average, Folklorama receives over 400,000 pavilion visits each year. The 2019 Festival received approximately 455,000 pavilion visits to 45 pavilions. The majority of those who attend the Festival visit more than one pavilion.
 About 21% of pavilion visitors come from outside of Winnipeg.
 Typically, more than 3,000 entertainers perform at more than 1,500 shows throughout the two-week Festival.
 On average, 600,000 meals are served and 1,000,000 beverages are poured before the conclusion of the Festival.
 Approximately 20,000 volunteers participate to make Folklorama possible.
 Folklorama has an economic impact of about $14.7 million on the Manitoba economy.

References

Cultural festivals in Canada
Festivals in Winnipeg
Festivals of multiculturalism
Multiculturalism in Canada
1970 establishments in Manitoba
Recurring events established in 1970
Tourist attractions in Winnipeg
Annual events in Winnipeg
Folk festivals in Canada